Annunciation Greek Orthodox Church in Wauwatosa, Wisconsin, United States, was designed by architect Frank Lloyd Wright in 1956, and completed in 1961. It is listed on the National Register of Historic Places. The church is one of Wright's last works; construction was completed after his death. The design is informed by traditional Byzantine architectural forms, reinterpreted by Wright to suit the modern context. The church's shallow scalloped dome echoes his Marin County Civic Center.

Design
According to Bruce Brooks Pfeiffer (Wright scholar and original archivist of the Frank Lloyd Wright Archives), "When he received a commission for a church for the Milwaukee Hellenic Community, Wright consulted his wife, who was brought up in the Greek Orthodox faith, about the predominant symbols of the church. 'The cross and the dome,' was her reply." These two architectural forms dominate the design. The floor plan itself is a Greek cross. Wide arches support the upper level, or balcony. The roof dome sits atop an inverted dome, or bowl. Through simplification and abstraction of the forms, Wright succeeded in artfully translating the cross and the dome from their historical Byzantine context to the vastly dissimilar setting of the twentieth-century American Midwest. Much of the building utilizes a gold-anodized aluminum which, at the time, was a new material that Alcoa established. Since its construction, there have been a few renovations due to structural problems—including the replacement of the dome's original exterior tile to a synthetic plastic resin.

While Wright's design was inspired by traditional Byzantine forms and the Hagia Sophia in particular, the church was not meant as a purely historicist tribute; rather, it was an update and reinterpretation of architectural forms very much alive. In a letter dated September 9, 1958—when the project was well into the working drawings stages—Wright explained: "The edifice is in itself a complete work of modern art and science belonging to today but dedicated to ancient tradition—contributing to Tradition instead of living upon it."

Gallery

See also 
 National Register of Historic Places listings in Milwaukee County, Wisconsin

Notes

 Storrer, William Allin. The Frank Lloyd Wright Companion. University Of Chicago Press, 2006,  (S.399)

External links

 Annunciation Greek Orthodox Church website
 Wright in Wisconsin
 Contemporary photographs of the Annunciation Greek Orthodox Church

Frank Lloyd Wright buildings
Churches in Milwaukee County, Wisconsin
Eastern Orthodox churches in Wisconsin
Greek Orthodox Archdiocese of America
Greek Orthodox churches in the United States
Churches completed in 1962
20th-century Eastern Orthodox church buildings
Churches on the National Register of Historic Places in Wisconsin
Wauwatosa, Wisconsin
National Register of Historic Places in Milwaukee County, Wisconsin